Batdorj-in Baasanjab (Mongolian: , Батдоржын Баасанжав, Batdorjyn Baasanjav; born 1954), also known by his Chinese name Basenzhabu or simply Ba Sen, is a Chinese actor of Mongol descent from Xinjiang Uygur Autonomous Region. He is a descendant of Genghis Khan's second son, Chagatai, and is best known for portraying Genghis Khan in the 2004 Chinese-Mongolian television series, Genghis Khan.

Career 
At the age of 13, Ba Sen started learning dancing in the Inner Mongolian Arts School. After graduation, he became a dancer in a group in the Chinese military. Since 1984, he has been working as an actor in the Inner Mongolian Film Agency. His first role was Herder Suhee in the drama Huan Jinhai. He played the eponymous role in the 2004 television series Genghis Khan.

Personal life 
Ba Sen married Saran Gua, a singer from the Inner Mongolian Opera and Dance Theatre.

Filmography

Film

Television

References

External links
  Ba Sen's blog on Sina.com
 

1954 births
Mongolian artists
Chinese male film actors
Chinese male television actors
Male actors from Xinjiang
People from Bortala
Living people
Chinese people of Mongolian descent